Jyoti Prakash Dutta is a Bangladeshi short-story writer. He was awarded Ekushey Padak in 2016 by the Government of Bangladesh.

Career
Dutta has been serving as a Professor of the Department of Economics and the dean of Social Sciences Faculty at the University of Chittagong.

Personal life
Dutta is married to scientist Purabi Basu.

References

Living people
Bangladeshi male writers
Bangladeshi short story writers
Bangladeshi Hindus
Recipients of the Ekushey Padak
Academic staff of the University of Chittagong
Year of birth missing (living people)